The 2011 Valencia City Council election, also the 2011 Valencia municipal election, was held on Sunday, 22 May 2011, to elect the 9th City Council of the municipality of Valencia. All 33 seats in the City Council were up for election. The election was held simultaneously with regional elections in thirteen autonomous communities and local elections all throughout Spain.

The election saw the ruling People's Party (PP) obtaining a new absolute majority, which allowed incumbent Mayor Rita Barberá to be re-elected for a sixth consecutive term in office. On the other hand, the Spanish Socialist Workers' Party (PSOE) saw a sharp decline in support, suffering from the nationwide backlash against José Luis Rodríguez Zapatero-led Government of Spain amid a harsh financial crisis at the time and scoring its worst historical result in a municipal election up to that point.

Also entering the City Council were the Compromís coalition, formed by the Valencian Nationalist Bloc (Bloc), Initiative of the Valencian People (IdPV) and The Greens–Ecologist Left of the Valencian Country (EV–EE), which emerged as the third political force in the city; and United Left of the Valencian Country (EUPV), the regional branch of United Left, which returned to the City Council after being left out in the previous election.

Electoral system
The City Council of Valencia was the top-tier administrative and governing body of the municipality of Valencia, composed of the mayor, the government council and the elected plenary assembly. Elections to the local councils in Spain were fixed for the fourth Sunday of May every four years.

Voting for the local assembly was on the basis of universal suffrage, which comprised all nationals over 18 years of age, registered and residing in the municipality of Valencia and in full enjoyment of their political rights, as well as resident non-national European citizens and those whose country of origin allowed Spanish nationals to vote in their own elections by virtue of a treaty. Local councillors were elected using the D'Hondt method and a closed list proportional representation, with an electoral threshold of five percent of valid votes—which included blank ballots—being applied in each local council. Councillors were allocated to municipal councils based on the following scale:

The mayor was indirectly elected by the plenary assembly. A legal clause required that mayoral candidates earned the vote of an absolute majority of councillors, or else the candidate of the most-voted party in the assembly was to be automatically appointed to the post. In the event of a tie, the appointee would be determined by lot.

The electoral law allowed for parties and federations registered in the interior ministry, coalitions and groupings of electors to present lists of candidates. Parties and federations intending to form a coalition ahead of an election were required to inform the relevant Electoral Commission within ten days of the election call, whereas groupings of electors needed to secure the signature of a determined amount of the electors registered in the municipality for which they were seeking election, disallowing electors from signing for more than one list of candidates. For the case of Valencia, as its population was between 300,001 and 1,000,000, at least 5,000 signatures were required.

Parties and leaders
Below is a list of the main parties and coalitions which contested the election:

Opinion polls
The table below lists voting intention estimates in reverse chronological order, showing the most recent first and using the dates when the survey fieldwork was done, as opposed to the date of publication. Where the fieldwork dates are unknown, the date of publication is given instead. The highest percentage figure in each polling survey is displayed with its background shaded in the leading party's colour. If a tie ensues, this is applied to the figures with the highest percentages. The "Lead" column on the right shows the percentage-point difference between the parties with the highest percentages in a poll. When available, seat projections determined by the polling organisations are displayed below (or in place of) the percentages in a smaller font; 17 seats were required for an absolute majority in the City Council of Valencia.

Results

References
Opinion poll sources

Other

Valencia
Elections in Valencia